Camryn Ann Biegalski (born August 11, 1998) is an American professional soccer player who plays as a defender for National Women's Soccer League (NWSL) club Washington Spirit.

Club career

Chicago Red Stars
Biegalski made her NWSL debut on September 12, 2020.

References

External links
 
 Wisconsin profile

Living people
American women's soccer players
Women's association football defenders
Chicago Red Stars players
National Women's Soccer League players
Wisconsin Badgers women's soccer players
1998 births
Washington Spirit players
Chicago Red Stars draft picks